Second wave or Wave 2 may refer to:

Arts and entertainment
 Hong Kong Second Wave, a group of Hong Kong film directors in late 1980s to 1990s
 Second Wave, a fictional terrorist group from the second season of 24

Music
 Second wave ska, or 2 Tone, music genre created in England in the late 1970s
 2nd Wave (album), a 1988 album by Surface
 The Second Wave (Khoma album), a 2006 album by Khoma
 The Second Wave: 25 Years of NWOBHM, a 2003 album by British indie label Communiqué Records

Computing
 802.11ac Wave 2, 2nd generation 802.11ac Wi-Fi products
 Wave 2, an update for Windows Live

History
 Second-wave feminism, a period of feminist history lasting approximately from the late 1960s through the 1980s
 Second European colonization wave, starting in the second half of the 19th century with the New Imperialism period
 The deadly second wave of the Spanish flu
 The second wave of the COVID-19 pandemic